The Malayan flying frog (Zhangixalus prominanus) is a species of frog in the moss frog family (Rhacophoridae). It is found in Indonesia, Malaysia, and Thailand.

This is a largish flying frog, with females growing to a body length of up to 7.6 cm (about 3 in), and males reaching up to 6.2 cm in body length. It is generally jade green on the back and somewhat translucent when small, and a prominent red blotch on the webbing extends between the third and fifth hind toes.

Tadpoles are greyish green and have no markings. Towards metamorphosis, they become greener. They lose their tails when they are about 30–33 mm long, and freshly emergent juveniles measure about 15 mm. The labial tooth row formula (LTRF) is 5(2-5)/3 in small tadpoles and 6(2-6)/3 in older ones.

Its natural habitats are subtropical and tropical moist montane forests above 600 meters ASL, where it inhabits rivers, intermittent rivers, and intermittent freshwater marshes. It is not considered threatened by the IUCN, which classify it as a Species of Least Concern.

See also
 Rhacophorus bipunctatus and Rhacophorus rhodopus
 Rhacophorus kio a cryptic sister species of Rhacophorus reinwardtii

References

External links
Amphibian and Reptiles of Peninsular Malaysia – Rhacophorus prominanus

Rhacophorus
Taxonomy articles created by Polbot
Amphibians described in 1924